Two Sides of "Crash" (also known as Afraid I'll Want to Love Her One More Time) is an album by country singer Billy "Crash" Craddock. It was released in 1973 on ABC Records. It was produced by Ron Chancey.

Track listing 
"Afraid I'll Want to Love Her One More Time"
"What Does a Loser Say"
"Another Cup of Memories"
"Don't Be Angry"
"A Living Example"
"I'm a White Boy"
"I'm Gonna Knock on Your Door"
"Come a Little Bit Closer"
"You Can't Judge a Book By the Cover"
"Ain't Nothin' Shakin'"

References

Billy "Crash" Craddock albums
1973 albums
Albums produced by Ron Chancey
ABC Records albums